Paul Raymond Hunter is Professor in Medicine at the University of East Anglia. He was the first professor of health protection in the United Kingdom when he was appointed to the Norwich Medical School in 2001. He is a fellow of the Royal College of Pathologists, the Royal Society of Biology, and of the Faculty of Public Health.

He holds an MB ChB and MD from the University of Manchester and an MBA from the Open University. He has an h-index of 77 according to Google Scholar.

References

External links 
https://www.researchgate.net/profile/Paul_Hunter

Year of birth missing (living people)
Living people
Alumni of the University of Manchester
Alumni of the Open University
Academics of the University of East Anglia
20th-century British medical doctors
21st-century British medical doctors
British microbiologists
Fellows of the Royal College of Pathologists
Fellows of the Royal Society of Biology
Fellows of the Faculty of Public Health